The Men's madison event of the 2015 UCI Track Cycling World Championships was held on 22 February 2015.

Results
The race consisted of 200 laps (50 km) with 10 sprints and was completed in 54:44.793, resulting in an average speed of 54.797 km/h, which is 34.493 mp/h.

References

Men's madison
UCI Track Cycling World Championships – Men's madison